Planiscutellum is a genus of trilobites in the order Corynexochida family Styginidae. These trilobites were nektobenthic detritivore. They lived in the Silurian period in the upper Ludlow epoch, from 422.9 ± 1.5 to 418.7 ± 2.8 million years ago.

Distribution
Silurian of Canada (Quebec, Yukon), the Czech Republic, the United Kingdom; Ordovician to Silurian of Canada (Québec)

References
Biolib
Paleobiology Database
Sepkoski, Jack Sepkoski's Online Genus Database – Trilobita

Silurian trilobites
Styginidae
Corynexochida genera
Ordovician trilobites of Europe
Ordovician trilobites of North America
Paleozoic life of Quebec
Paleozoic life of Yukon